Windsor Township is one of the fourteen townships of Morgan County, Ohio, United States.  The 2000 census found 1,951 people in the township, 1,411 of whom lived in the unincorporated portions of the township.

Geography
Located in the southeastern corner of the county, it borders the following townships:
Meigsville Township - north
Center Township - northeast
Waterford Township, Washington County - east
Watertown Township, Washington County - southeast, north of Palmer Township
Palmer Township, Washington County - southeast, south of Watertown Township
Wesley Township, Washington County - south
Marion Township - southwest
Penn Township - west
Malta Township - northwest, west of Morgan Township
Morgan Township - northwest, east of Malta Township

The village of Stockport is located in western Windsor Township.

Name and history
Statewide, other Windsor Townships are located in Ashtabula and Lawrence counties.

Government
The township is governed by a three-member board of trustees, who are elected in November of odd-numbered years to a four-year term beginning on the following January 1. Two are elected in the year after the presidential election and one is elected in the year before it. There is also an elected township fiscal officer, who serves a four-year term beginning on April 1 of the year after the election, which is held in November of the year before the presidential election. Vacancies in the fiscal officership or on the board of trustees are filled by the remaining trustees.

As of 2007, the trustees are Phillip Eckert, Columbus Cheadle, and Mark Murphy, and the clerk is Kerrie Greuey.

References

External links
County website

Townships in Morgan County, Ohio
Townships in Ohio